Cathy Sherk (née Graham, born June 17, 1950) is a Canadian golf champion and professional golf coach and instructor.

Golfing career

Sherk was born in Bancroft, Ontario. She won the 1977 Canadian Women's Amateur and was runner-up to Beth Daniel at the U.S. Women's Amateur. The following year her performances earned her the 1978 No.1 World Amateur ranking by Golf Digest and she was named co-winner of the Velma Springstead Trophy as her country's outstanding female athlete. That year she successfully defended her Canadian championship and won the U.S. Women's Amateur, the North and South Women's Amateur and earned silver medal honors as a member of the Canadian team at the 1978 Espirito Santo Trophy.

In 1979, Sherk turned professional and joined the LPGA Tour where she finished the season in third place for Rookie-of-the-Year honors behind Beth Daniel. Married to Ric Sherk and wanting to spend time with him and their son Chris, she continued playing on the LPGA on a limited basis until 1983, her best finish coming at the 1981 American/Defender WRAL Classic when she finished runner-up to Donna Caponi.

In Canada she was the 1986, 1987 and 1990 Women's CPGA champion. Active as a teacher of young golfers, she ran the Ontario Junior Girls Golf Camp and was National Coach of the Canadian Ladies Golf Association from 1995 to 1999. In 1995 she was inducted into the Canadian Golf Hall of Fame.

Amateur wins
1976 Ontario Women's Amateur
1977 Canadian Women's Amateur
1978 U.S. Women's Amateur, North and South Women's Amateur, Canadian Women's Amateur, Ontario Women's Amateur

Professional wins
1988 Canadian PGA Women's Championship
1990 Canadian PGA Women's Championship
1991 Canadian PGA Women's Championship

Team appearances
Amateur
Espirito Santo Trophy (representing Canada): 1978

References

External links

Biography at the Canadian Golf Hall of Fame

Canadian female golfers
LPGA Tour golfers
Winners of ladies' major amateur golf championships
Golfing people from Ontario
1950 births
Living people